HMS Daphne was a Royal Navy corvette, the name ship of her class, commissioned in 1839

Daphne ran aground on the Horse Bank in the Solent on 5 January 1847. She was refloated with assistance from the paddle tug  and towed to Spithead in Hampshire. She was repaired and returned to service.

Daphne was sold in 1866.

References

Footnotes

Bibliography
 Lyon, David and Rif Winfield. The Sail and Steam Navy List: All of the Ships of the Royal Navy, 1815-1889. London: Chatham Publishing. 2004, p. 120.

External links
 

 

Corvettes of the Royal Navy
Daphne-class corvette
Maritime incidents in January 1847